This is an episode listing for the Discovery Channel Television show The New Detectives, with the episodes' original air date included, if available.

Series overview

Episodes

Season 1 (1996)

Season 2 (1997)

Season 3 (1997–98)

Season 4 (1998–99)

Season 5 (1999–2000)

Season 6 (2000–01)

Season 7 (2001–02)

Season 8 (2002–03)

Season 9 (2003–04)

*A pseudonym for the victim was given in the episode
+A pseudonym for the killer was given in the episode

References

The New Detectives – New Dominion Pictures
TV Guide – The New Detectives Episode Guide
TV MSN – The New Detectives
TV.com – The New Detectives

New Detectives